Priyatama (Matathi: प्रियतमा.... खडकाळ माळराणावर फुललेलं एक हळवं प्रीतस्वप्न) is a 2014 Marathi film. The film is the story of Parsha and Gauri in a small village of Maharashtra in 1951, who fall in love despite belonging to different social classes and opposite lifestyles.

Priyatama was released in theaters on 14 February 2014.

Plot
Parsha belongs to a community in Maharashtra, known as "Potraj", who are said to be messengers of Goddess Lakshmi, and devote their entire lives to this service. This community travels around and makes temporary shelters at each village, feeding themselves on grains donated by villagers, as they are not allowed to live normal lives. Members of Potraj carry a whip, called Korda, and regularly practice mortification of the flesh, as a way to please Lakshmi.

Parsha soon meets Gauri, a sweet young village girl belonging to a very rich family. Her father is Sarpanch of that village. Initially Gauri is scared of Parsha, but soon she begins to see a different person in him and they both start developing feelings for each other. Their mutual feelings get stronger with every meeting. Soon, they realize that they cannot live without each other, and conflict arises when they face rough reactions from both ends of society.

The film draws inspiration from Shakespeare's play, Romeo and Juliet.

Cast
 Siddarth Jadhav as Parsha
 Girija Joshi as Gauri
 Sagar Satpute  as shiva

Soundtrack

 
The soundtrack of Priyatama was composed by Chaitanya Adkar while the lyrics were provided by Prakash Holkar and Abhay Inamdar.

References

External links
 

2014 films
2010s Marathi-language films
Films based on Romeo and Juliet